is an award-winning Finnish entertainment program on MTV3 that started on April 12, 2020, based on the British Taskmaster television format. Competitors perform various tasks that they receive from the Grand Master.

In the each episode of each Season, there are four regular contestants with different fifth changing competitor each episode. Competitors perform tasks for points and the one with the most points wins. In each episode, the prize is different items from the competitors that the competitors have brought with them. The winner of each episode gets all the items brought in. The overall season winner, which is one of the regular contestants, wins the "Grand Master Statue", and is the contestant of the season.

The first series took a summer break on 17 May 2020, with three episodes from the first production season not shown, and the remaining episodes were shown on MTV3 and the streaming service on MTV from 13 to 27 August 2020. More episodes were released on 17 May 2020. The first season was a great success, and for that, on August 27, 2020, a second season of the series was announced for spring of 2021.

Suurmestari has won the Kultainen Venla of the "Best Game Show" of the Year three times in the row, on 2020, 2021 and 2022.

Cast

Season overview

Episodes

Season 1 (2020)
This is the first season of Suurmestari. The regular contestants of the season were Jukka Hildén,  and Janne Kataja. The season was won by Jukka Hildén.

Season 2 (2021)
This is the second season of Suurmestari. The season was won by Minka Kuustonen.

Season 3 (2022)
The third Season was announced by MTV in October 2021. The recordings of ten episodes were held during November 2021. Season premiered on MTV in April 2022. The season was won by Riku Rantala with 180 points. Mikko Penttilä finished second, Jenni Pääskysaari third and Anna-Maija Tuokko last place.

Season 4 (2023)

Awards and nominations

Notes

References

Taskmaster (TV series)
2020s game shows
2020s Finnish television series
2020 Finnish television series debuts
MTV3 original programming
Finnish television series based on British television series
Finnish-language television shows